"Cash and Curry" is the third episode of series 1 of the BBC sit-com Only Fools and Horses. It was first screened on 22 September 1981. In the episode, Del Boy sees a chance to profit from a dispute between two Indian businessmen.

Synopsis
Rodney arrives to pick Del Boy up from a Dinner and Dance. While there, Rodney is introduced by Del to Vimmal Malik, an Indian man who is looking for business opportunities, much to Del's interest. Outside, the brothers become involved in a dispute between Vimmal and Mr Ram, a man who seems to have a vendetta against Vimmal. During the exchange, Ram's bodyguard tries to intimidate Del with faked Karate moves, but Del distracts him and hits him in the groin. Del, however, agrees to talk with Ram while Rodney drives Vimmal home.

At an Indian restaurant which Ram claims to be one of eighteen he owns, Ram explains to Del and Rodney (who arrived looking for Del) that he and Malik are from rival families, each of whom makes claim to an ancient statue of the Hindu God Kubera (who Del originally believed to be "one of India's premier wicketkeepers"), a statue of great sentimental and financial value. Malik has the statue but Ram wants it back and informs Del that he is prepared to pay £4,000 for it. He is unable to make such an offer directly however, due to the caste system preventing him from speaking to Malik directly. Sensing an opportunity to profit, Del agrees to act as a messenger for Ram and Vimmal.

Del speaks to Malik, informing him that Ram is prepared to pay £2,000, with his intention being to keep the other £2,000 for himself. Malik eventually accepts the offer, but is unwilling to hand over the statue before receiving the cash. A problem emerges when it becomes clear that Ram is equally unwilling to hand over the money before receiving the statue. Rodney at this point attempts to convince Del to let the deal go, but Del is unrelenting and decides to raise the £2,000 himself by selling off unwanted or unneeded items from the flat. Eventually he succeeds in convincing Rodney to go along with the plan.

The money is duly raised and paid to Malik, and the statue handed over. When Del Boy and Rodney go to the restaurant Ram supposedly owns, however, they find that he is gone – and that he does not own the restaurant and never did. The waiter there, who is the real owner of the restaurant, informs him that the cheque provided by Ram bounced, and that enquiries as to his accommodation revealed Ram had left there as well, leaving three weeks' rent unpaid. Adding to the Trotter's woes, the owner examines the statue and reveals that they cost just £17 in Portobello Road. Del and Rodney rush to Malik's hotel to inform him that Ram has left, but find Malik has also disappeared.

Meanwhile, on the motorway, Malik and Ram joke to each other about the stupidity of the Trotter brothers in falling for the scam, and it emerges that they are professional con artists who have successfully carried this out in various other cities (Cardiff, Bristol, Southampton, and North and South London), as they travel to their next destination to try it again.

Outside Malik's hotel, Rodney tries to cheer Del up by jokingly suggesting they head to a curry house, and Del angrily throws the statue at Rodney. The camera freezes as the statue is still in the air.

Episode cast

Episode concept
The idea for the script was based purely on the name of the episode, "Cash and Curry", from that the script was devised.

Music
Pink Floyd: "Money"

Note: In the VHS/DVD versions, Pink Floyd's "Money" is replaced by another piece of music. The original soundtrack is restored on the iTunes release.

Ronnie Hazlehurst: Original Theme Tune

Note: In the original series 1 broadcasts of Only Fools and Horses, the theme tune was very different to the version adopted from series 2, which became the standard version known today. Composed by Ronnie Hazlehurst, the original theme tune was a jazzy instrumental tune that played over the start and end credits. This tune was replaced in series 2 with a version written and sung by John Sullivan. After the initial run of series 1, all future re-runs replaced the Hazlehurst version with John Sullivan's to match the other series. The VHS/DVD versions all contain John Sullivan's version, and recordings with Hazlehurst's original tune are extremely rare, though it can be heard in a scene during episode 1 of the first series.

References

External links

1981 British television episodes
Only Fools and Horses (series 1) episodes